Escort is a Turkish computer manufacturer and Consumer electronics retail chain.

History
The company was founded in 1991 as a computer manufacturer, growing to provide a supply service through its own network of retail stores. As of 2014 Escort consisted of twelve subsidiary companies providing services in: software development, consulting, sales and marketing, distribution of Toshiba home electronics, software and equipment for the banking industry. 
Shares in Escort Teknoloji Yatırım A.Ş have been traded on the Istanbul Stock Exchange since 2000.

References

External links
The Escort homepage

Turkish companies established in 1991
Companies of Turkey
Electronics companies established in 1991
Electronics companies of Turkey